Nipawin Hydroelectric Station is a hydroelectric station owned by SaskPower, located near Nipawin, Saskatchewan, Canada.

Description 

The Nipawin Hydroelectric Station has a capacity of 255MW, and consists of:
one Hitachi 85 net MW unit (commissioned in 1985)
two Hitachi 85 net MW units (commissioned in 1986)

It is possible to expand the station to five generating units, which would keep the baseload capacity at 255MW, but would increase the peak capacity to 420MW.

See also 

 SaskPower
 E.B. Campbell Hydroelectric Station

References

External links 
  SaskPower Station Description

Hydroelectric power stations in Saskatchewan
Nipawin No. 487, Saskatchewan
SaskPower
Torch River No. 488, Saskatchewan
Dams in the Saskatchewan River basin
Saskatchewan River